was a judicial decision of the House of Lords in relation to recovery for pure economic loss in tort.

The court overruled the decision Anns v Merton London Borough Council with respect to duty of care in English law.

Facts
A builder failed to build proper foundations to a house. The defendant local authority, approving the building for its building regulations, failed to recognise the problem. When the building became dangerously unstable, the claimant, being unable to raise any money for repairs and choosing not to sue anyone at that stage therefore had to sell the house at a considerable loss. He sought to recover his loss from Brentwood District Council, but this action failed as the loss, the deflated value he obtained for the house, was classed as a pure economic loss.

Judgment
The House of Lords overruled Anns and held that the council was not liable in the absence of physical injury. Also, the case of Dutton v Bognor Regis UDC was disapproved.

This judgment was rejected in some Commonwealth jurisdictions, notably Canada, Australia, Singapore, and New Zealand, all of which preferred the two stage Anns test of proximity and policy.

Reflection
Just as in the Anns case, Building Regulations are part of the bylaws of the local Council. The Regulations require that notice should be given to the Council both at the commencement of the work and at specific stages, such as when the foundation trenches were ready to be poured. Councils have the power to inspect the foundations and to require any corrections necessary to bring the work into conformity with the bylaws, but they are not under an obligation to do so. In Anns the House of Lords considered whether the local council were under any duty of care toward owners or occupiers of houses as regards inspection during the building process, and unanimously decided that a duty of care did exist and that such a duty was not barred by a "limitation of actions" statute.

Anns has been overruled, with the conclusion that a person who has a right has no duties implicitly attached to that right.  Jurists Mickey Dias and Hohfeld have shown that rights and duties are jural correlatives. That is to say: if someone has a right, someone else owes a duty to them.  So here, the inspectors have a right (to inspect), and the builder has a duty (to let them inspect).

 

If the Building Regulations do not serve to protect the interests of the individual purchaser of the building, what then is their purpose?  It seems that they are no more than a means for the Council to maintain building standards in general and to prevent foreseeable dangers to life and limb while imposing no duty to maintain standards otherwise in each particular case.

References

 Full text of decision from BAILII.org

House of Lords cases
English tort case law
1990 in case law
1990 in British law
1990s in Essex
Borough of Brentwood